The 1924 Central Michigan Normalites football team represented Central Michigan Normal School, later renamed Central Michigan University, as an independent during the 1924 college football season. In their first season under head coach Lester Barnard, the Central Michigan football team compiled a 7–1 record, shut out six of eight opponents, and outscored all opponents by a combined total of 158 to 19. The team's sole loss was to Albion by a 13–12 score.

Schedule

References

Central Michigan
Central Michigan Chippewas football seasons
Central Michigan Normalites football